Kliellidae is a family of crustaceans belonging to the order Podocopida.

Genera:
 Kliella Schaefer, 1945
 Nannokliella Schaefer, 1945

References

Crustaceans